Aiono is both a surname and a given name. Notable people with the name include:

Alex Aiono (born 1996), American singer and YouTuber
James Aiono (born 1989), American football player
Aiono Nonumalo Sofara, Samoan chief
Aiono Fanaafi Le Tagaloa (1932–2014), Samoan chief, historian, and writer